Helianthemum , known as rock rose, sunrose, rushrose, or frostweed, is a genus of about 110 species of flowering plants in the family Cistaceae. They are widely distributed throughout the Northern Hemisphere, especially in the Mediterranean. 

New World species formerly classified as Helianthemum have been transferred to genus Crocanthemum.

Description
These are usually shrubs or subshrubs, and some are herbaceous
annuals or perennials. The leaves are oppositely arranged, but some plants may have alternately arranged leaves along the upper stems. The flowers are solitary or borne in an array of inflorescence types, such as panicles, racemes, or headlike clusters. The flower has three inner sepals and two smaller outer sepals. It has five petals usually in shades of yellow, orange, or pink. The style at the center is tipped with a large stigma. The fruit is a capsule containing many seeds.

Ecology
Helianthemum are known to form symbioses with mycorrhizal fungi. In the Mediterranean they are associated with Terfeziaceae, the desert truffles. Together, plant and fungus may have a beneficial effect on the arid local landscapes, preventing soil erosion and desertification. Some symbiotic pairs include Helianthemum salicifolium and the truffle Tirmania nivea, and H. guttatum and T. pinoyi.

One of the most commonly observed mycorrhizae on Helianthemum is a member of a different family, Cenococcum geophilum. This fungus is not host-specific, and it often associates with oaks, as well. Some studies suggest that Helianthemum and oaks growing together in a habitat may "share" their mycorrhizae.

Helianthemum are food plants for the larvae of some Lepidoptera species, such as the large grizzled skipper and the silver-studded blue. The leaf miners Bucculatrix helianthemi and B. regaella both feed exclusively on Helianthemum sessiliflorum, as does Coleophora eupreta. C. ochrea is limited to Helianthemum, and C. bilineella and C. potentillae have been observed on the genus.

Cultivation
Several Helianthemum species, and the numerous hybrids and cultivars derived from them, are widely grown as ornamental plants, popular in rockeries. A broader range of colours is available among the cultivars, including bright salmon-pink to dark red. They are best grown in well-drained soil in full sun, and have a long flowering period from spring to summer. Numerous cultivars have gained the Royal Horticultural Society's Award of Garden Merit: 

'Amy Baring' (yellow)
'Fire Dragon' 
'Henfield Brilliant' (scarlet)
'Jubilee' (pale yellow)
'Mrs C.W. Earle' (red)
'Rhodanthe Carneum' (pink)
'The Bride' (white)
'Wisley Primrose' (primrose yellow)

Selected species

Species include:

Helianthemum aegyptiacum
Helianthemum almeriense
Helianthemum apenninum – white rockrose
Helianthemum asperum
Helianthemum canariense
Helianthemum canum – hoary rockrose
Helianthemum caput-felis
Helianthemum cinereum 
Helianthemum coulteri see: Crocanthemum coulteri
Helianthemum croceum
Helianthemum guerrae
Helianthemum hirtum 
Helianthemum hymettium
Helianthemum jonium
Helianthemum kahiricum
Helianthemum lavandulifolium
Helianthemum ledifolium
Helianthemum leptophyllum
Helianthemum lippii
Helianthemum lunulatum 
Helianthemum marifolium
Helianthemum morisianum
Helianthemum nummularium – common rockrose
Helianthemum oelandicum – alpine rockrose (syn. Helianthemum montanum)
Helianthemum oelandicum subsp. alpestre (syn. H. alpestre)
Helianthemum oelandicum subsp. italicum (syn. H. italicum)
Helianthemum oelandicum subsp. oelandicum
Helianthemum oelandicum subsp. orientale (syn. H. orientale)
Helianthemum oelandicum subsp. rupifragum (syn. H. rupifragum)
Helianthemum origanifolium
Helianthemum pannosum
Helianthemum papillare
Helianthemum piliferum
Helianthemum pilosum 
Helianthemum rossmaessler
Helianthemum salicifolium
Helianthemum sanguineum
Helianthemum sessiliflorum
Helianthemum songaricum
Helianthemum squamatum
Helianthemum stipulatum
Helianthemum villosum
Helianthemum virgatum
Helianthemum viscarium
Helianthemum viscidulum

References

External links

Flora Europaea: Helianthemum
eFloras search results for Helianthemum

 
Malvales genera
Taxa named by Philip Miller